Telkom (formerly known as 8.ta from 18 October 2010 till 19 March 2013 and as Telkom Mobile From 19 March 2013 till 2014), is a South African mobile telecommunications company. Telkom was launched in October 2010 and is owned by Telkom SOC. Telkom phone numbers use the 0811 to 0819 dialling prefixes. Telkom's Main competitors in South African mobile telecommunication industry includes MTN, Vodacom, Cell C and Rain

Technology
The Telkom network provides voice and data products and services over a unified 2G / 3G network. Telkom has launched LTE on the 2300 MHz frequency band offering speeds of up to 100Mbit/s. As of 27 october 2022 Telkom has added 5G FWA high speed connections partnering with China's Huawei Technologies.

Telkom Music
Telkom Mobile partnered with Tencent Africa to launch Telkom Music, a music streaming service with the Telkom Music Powered By JOOX app.

See also
Mobile telephony in Africa
Telecommunications in South Africa
Internet in South Africa

References

External links
Official site
Telkom Music site

Mobile phone companies of South Africa
Companies based in the City of Tshwane
South African brands
Telecommunications companies established in 2010
South African companies established in 2010